3 Car Garage: The Indie Recordings '95–'96, also known simply as 3 Car Garage, is a compilation album by American pop rock group Hanson. It consists of material from their MMMBop demo album minus four tracks. There is much confusion that 3 Car Garage contains tracks from both the MMMBop and Boomerang demo albums, when actually, only songs from MMMBop are present. The tracks that never made it from MMMBop to 3 Car Garage are the shorter version of "MMMBop", "Something New", "Incredible", and "Baby (You're So Fine)".

As the songs on this album were recorded a year or two before Middle of Nowhere, the brothers' voices are noticeably higher pitched. The album also contains the original version of the hit song "MMMBop", which was a rock ballad, unlike the up-tempo pop version that became a hit. 3 Car Garage: The Indie Recordings is the only Hanson compilation not on streaming platforms.

Track listing

Personnel
 John Chambers – guitar
 JaMarc Davis – guitar
 Louis Drapp – bass, guitar, harmonica
 Isaac Hanson – guitar, fiddle, piano, producer, sequencing, vocals
 Taylor Hanson – piano, keyboards, conga, drums, producer, vocals
 Walker Hanson – photography
 Zac Hanson – drums, vocals, producer
 Craig Harmon – Hammond organ
 Lewis Harris – bass
 Dan Hersch – mastering
 Dana Higbee – piccolo
 Bill Inglot – mastering
 Stirling McIlwaine – photography
 John Morand – engineer

Charts

Weekly charts

Year-end charts

Certifications

References

Hanson (band) albums
1998 compilation albums
Mercury Records compilation albums